Travis Paul Clardy (born January 13, 1962) is an attorney from Nacogdoches, Texas, who is the Republican state representative for House District 11, which includes Cherokee, Nacogdoches, and Rusk counties in East Texas.

Clardy serves on the House committees on Human Services and Homeland Security and Public Safety.

Affiliations 
Clardy is a member of the executive board of the East Texas Boy Scouts of America and the Dean's Circle for College of Fine Arts at Stephen F. Austin State University. He is also a Paul P. Harris Fellow at the Nacogdoches Rotary International, a sponsor of the Heartbeat Pregnancy Center, and is active on the alumni board of his alma mater, Abilene Christian University.

Political positions 

In 2012, Clardy narrowly defeated the incumbent Representative Chuck Hopson, in the Republican primary election.

In the 2013 legislative session, Clardy joined majorities in the House and Texas Senate to support SB5, which banned abortions after twenty weeks of gestation, required abortion providers to meet ambulatory surgical center facilities regulations, and required physicians to have admitting privileges at a hospital within thirty miles of their office. In 2016, the facilities and admitting privileges portions of the bill were ruled unconstitutional by the Supreme Court in Whole Woman's Health v. Hellerstedt.

In the Republican primary on March 4, 2014, Clardy won re-nomination to a second term. He received 13,054 (84 percent) to opponent Tony Sevilla, who polled 2,487 votes (16 percent).

In the general election on November 6, 2018, Clardy defeated Democrat Alec Johnson, 38,694 votes (74.4 percent) to 13,334 (25.6 percent).

Personal life 
Clardy and his wife, Judy, have four sons. He is a member of the Church of Christ.

References

External links
 Campaign website
 State legislative page
 Travis Clardy at the Texas Tribune

1962 births
Living people
Republican Party members of the Texas House of Representatives
People from Nacogdoches, Texas
Texas lawyers
American members of the Churches of Christ
21st-century American politicians